Lech Krzysztof Paprzycki (14 April 1947 – 1 October 2022) was a Polish lawyer and politician. A member of the Polish People's Party, he served in the Sejm from 1989 to 1991. He was also a judge of the Supreme Court from 1999 to 2016, acting as First President from January to April 2014.

Paprzycki died on 1 October 2022, at the age of 75.

References

1947 births
2022 deaths
20th-century Polish lawyers
United People's Party (Poland) politicians
Members of the Contract Sejm
Nicolaus Copernicus University in Toruń alumni
University of Warsaw alumni
People from Grójec County